A neonatal intensive care unit (NICU), also known as an intensive care nursery (ICN), is an intensive care unit (ICU) specializing in the care of ill or premature newborn infants. Neonatal refers to the first 28 days of life. Neonatal care, as known as specialized nurseries or intensive care, has been around since the 1960's.

The first American newborn intensive care unit, designed by Louis Gluck, was opened in October 1960 at Yale New Haven Hospital.

NICU is typically directed by one or more neonatologists and staffed by resident physicians,  nurses, nurse practitioners, pharmacists, physician assistants, respiratory therapists, and dietitians. Many other ancillary disciplines and specialists are available at larger units.

The term neonatal comes from neo, "new", and natal, "pertaining to birth or origin".

Nursing and neonatal populations 

Healthcare institutions have varying entry-level requirements for neonatal nurses. Neonatal nurses are registered nurses (RNs), and therefore must have an Associate of Science in Nursing (ASN) or Bachelor of Science in Nursing (BSN) degree.  Some countries or institutions may also require a midwifery qualification.  Some institutions may accept newly graduated RNs having passed the NCLEX exam; others may require additional experience working in adult-health or medical/surgical nursing.

Some countries offer postgraduate degrees in neonatal nursing, such as the Master of Science in Nursing (MSN) and various doctorates.  A nurse practitioner may be required to hold a postgraduate degree.  The National Association of Neonatal Nurses recommends two years' experience working in a NICU before taking graduate classes.

As with any registered nurse, local licensing or certifying bodies, as well as employers, may set requirements for continuing education.

There are no mandated requirements to becoming an RN in an NICU, although neonatal nurses must have certification as a neonatal resuscitation provider.  Some units prefer new graduates who do not have experience in other units, so they may be trained in the specialty exclusively, while others prefer nurses with more experience already under their belt.

Intensive-care nurses undergo intensive didactic and clinical orientation in addition to their general nursing knowledge in order to provide highly specialized care for critical patients.  Their competencies include the administration of high-risk medications, management of high-acuity patients requiring ventilator support, surgical care, resuscitation, advanced interventions such as extracorporeal membrane oxygenation or hypothermia therapy for neonatal encephalopathy procedures, as well as chronic-care management or lower acuity cares associated with premature infants such as feeding intolerance, phototherapy, or administering antibiotics. NICU RNs undergo annual skills tests and are subject to additional training to maintain contemporary practice.

History 
The problem of premature and congenitally ill infants is not a new one.   As early as the 17th and 18th centuries, there were scholarly papers published that attempted to share knowledge of interventions. It was not until 1922, however, that hospitals started grouping the newborn infants into one area, now called the neonatal intensive care unit (NICU).

Before the industrial revolution, premature and ill infants were born and cared for at home and either lived or died without medical intervention.  In the mid-nineteenth century, the infant incubator was first developed, based on the incubators used for chicken eggs.  Dr. Stephane Tarnier is generally considered to be the father of the incubator (or isolette as it is now known), having developed it to attempt to keep premature infants in a Paris maternity ward warm. Other methods had been used before, but this was the first closed model; in addition, he helped convince other physicians that the treatment helped premature infants.  France became a forerunner in assisting premature infants, in part due to its concerns about a falling birth rate.

After Tarnier retired, Dr. Pierre Budin, followed in his footsteps, noting the limitations of infants in incubators and the importance of breastmilk and the mother's attachment to the child. Budin is known as the father of modern perinatology, and his seminal work The Nursling (Le Nourisson in French) became the first major publication to deal with the care of the neonate.

Another factor that contributed to the development of modern neonatology was Dr. Martin Couney and his permanent installment of premature babies in incubators at Coney Island.  A more controversial figure, he studied under Dr. Budin and brought attention to premature babies and their plight through his display of infants as sideshow attractions at Coney Island and the World's Fair in New York and Chicago in 1933 and 1939, respectively. Infants had also previously been displayed in incubators at the 1897, 1898, 1901, and 1904 World Fairs.

Early years 

Doctors took an increasing role in childbirth from the eighteenth century onward. However, the care of newborn babies, sick or well, remained largely in the hands of mothers and midwives. Some baby incubators, similar to those used for hatching chicks, were devised in the late nineteenth century. In the United States, these were shown at commercial exhibitions, complete with babies inside, until 1931. Dr A. Robert Bauer MD at Henry Ford Hospital in Detroit, MI, successfully combined oxygen, heat, humidity, ease of accessibility, and ease of nursing care in 1931. It was not until after the Second World War that special-care baby units (SCBUs, pronounced scaboo) were established in many hospitals. In Britain, early SCBUs opened in Birmingham and Bristol, the latter set up with only £100. At Southmead Hospital, Bristol, initial opposition from obstetricians lessened after quadruplets born there in 1948 were successfully cared for in the new unit.

Incubators were expensive, so the whole room was often kept warm instead. Cross-infection between babies was greatly feared. Strict nursing routines involved staff wearing gowns and masks, constant hand-washing and minimal handling of babies. Parents were sometimes allowed to watch through the windows of the unit. Much was learned about feeding—frequent, tiny feeds seemed best—and breathing. Oxygen was given freely until the end of the 1950s, when it was shown that the high concentrations reached inside incubators caused some babies to go blind. Monitoring conditions in the incubator, and the baby itself, was to become a major area of research.

The 1960s were a time of rapid medical advances, particularly in respiratory support, that were at last making the survival of premature newborn babies a reality. Very few babies born before thirty two weeks survived and those who did often had neurological impairments. Herbert Barrie in London pioneered advances in resuscitation of the newborn. Barrie published his seminal paper on the subject in The Lancet in 1963. One of the concerns at this time was the worry that using high pressures of oxygen could be damaging to newborn lungs. Barrie developed an underwater safety valve in the oxygen circuit. The tubes were originally made of rubber, but these had the potential to cause irritation to sensitive newborn tracheas: Barrie switched to plastic. This new endotracheal tube, based on Barrie's design, was known as the 'St Thomas's tube'.

Most early units had little equipment, providing only oxygen and warmth, and relied on careful nursing and observation. In later years, further research allowed technology to play a larger role in the decline of infant mortality.  The development of pulmonary surfactant, which facilitates the oxygenation and ventilation of underdeveloped lungs, has been the most important development in neonatology to date.

Increasing technology 

By the 1970's, NICUs were an established part of hospitals in the developed world. In Britain, some early units ran community programmes, sending experienced nurses to help care for premature babies at home. But increasingly technological monitoring and therapy meant special care for babies became hospital-based. By the 1980's, over 90% of births took place in hospital. The emergency dash from home to the NICU with baby in a transport incubator had become a thing of the past, though transport incubators were still needed. Specialist equipment and expertise were not available at every hospital, and strong arguments were made for large, centralised NICUs. On the downside was the long travelling time for frail babies and for parents. A 1979 study showed that 20% of babies in NICUs for up to a week were never visited by either parent.  Centralised or not, by the 1980s few questioned the role of NICUs in saving babies. Around 80% of babies born weighing less than 1.5 kg now survived, compared to around 40% in the 1960's. From 1982, pediatricians  in Britain could train and qualify in the sub-specialty of neonatal medicine.

Not only careful nursing but also new techniques and instruments now played a major role. As in adult intensive-care units, the use of monitoring and life-support systems became routine. These needed special modification for small babies, whose bodies were tiny and often immature. Adult ventilators, for example, could damage babies' lungs and gentler techniques with smaller pressure changes were devised. The many tubes and sensors used for monitoring the baby's condition, blood sampling and artificial feeding made some babies scarcely visible beneath the technology. Furthermore, by 1975, over 18% of newborn babies in Britain were being admitted to NICUs. Some hospitals admitted all babies delivered by Caesarian section or under 2500 g in weight. The fact that these babies missed early close contact with their mothers was a growing concern. The 1980's saw questions being raised about the human and economic costs of too much technology, and admission policies gradually became more conservative.

Changing priorities 

NICUs now concentrate on treating very small, premature, or congenitally ill babies. Some of these babies are from higher-order multiple births, but most are still single babies born too early. Premature labour, and how to prevent it, remains a perplexing problem for doctors. Even though medical advancements allow doctors to save low-birth-weight babies, it is almost invariably better to delay such births.

Over the last 10 years or so, SCBUs have become much more 'parent-friendly', encouraging maximum involvement with the babies. Routine gowns and masks are gone and parents are encouraged to help with care as much as possible. Cuddling and skin-to-skin contact, also known as Kangaroo care, are seen as beneficial for all but the frailest (very tiny babies are exhausted by the stimulus of being handled; or larger critically ill infants). Less stressful ways of delivering high-technology medicine to tiny patients have been devised: sensors to measure blood oxygen levels through the skin, for example; and ways of reducing the amount of blood taken for tests.

Some major problems of the NICU have almost disappeared. Exchange transfusions, in which all the blood is removed and replaced, are rare now. Rhesus incompatibility (a difference in blood groups) between mother and baby is largely preventable, and was the most common cause for exchange transfusion in the past.  However, breathing difficulties, intraventricular hemorrhage, necrotizing enterocolitis and infections still claim many infant lives and are the focus of many new and current research projects.

The long-term outlook for premature babies saved by NICUs has always been a concern. From the early years, it was reported that a higher proportion than normal grew up with disabilities, including cerebral palsy and learning difficulties. Now that treatments are available for many of the problems faced by tiny or immature babies in the first weeks of life, long-term follow-up, and minimising long-term disability, are major research areas.

Besides prematurity and extreme low birth-weight, common diseases cared for in a NICU include perinatal asphyxia, major birth defects, sepsis, neonatal jaundice, and infant respiratory distress syndrome due to immaturity of the lungs. In general, the leading cause of death in NICUs is necrotizing enterocolitis. Complications of extreme prematurity may include intracranial hemorrhage, chronic bronchopulmonary dysplasia (see Infant respiratory distress syndrome), or retinopathy of prematurity. An infant may spend a day of observation in a NICU or may spend many months there.

Neonatology and NICUs have greatly increased the survival of very low birth-weight and extremely premature infants. In the era before NICUs, infants of birth weight less than 1400 grams (3 lb, usually about 30 weeks gestation) rarely survived. Today, infants of 500 grams at 26 weeks have a fair chance of survival. As of 2022, the world record for the lowest gestational age newborn to survive is held by Curtis Zy-Keith Means, who was born on 5 July 2020 in the United States, at 21 weeks and 1 day gestational age, weighing 420 grams.

The NICU environment provides challenges as well as benefits. Stressors for the infants can include continual light, a high level of noise, separation from their mothers, reduced physical contact, painful procedures, and interference with the opportunity to breastfeed. To date there have been very few studies investigating noise reduction interventions in the NICU and it remains uncertain what their effects could be on babies' growth and development. A NICU can be stressful for the staff as well. A special aspect of NICU stress for both parents and staff is that infants may survive, but with damage to the brain, lungs or eyes.

NICU rotations are essential aspects of pediatric and obstetric residency programs, but NICU experience is encouraged by other specialty residencies, such as family practice, surgery, pharmacy, and emergency medicine.

Equipment

Incubator 

An incubator (or isolette or humidicrib) is an apparatus used to maintain environmental conditions suitable for a neonate (newborn baby). It is used in preterm births or for some ill full-term babies.

There is additional equipment used to evaluate and treat sick neonates. These include:

Blood pressure monitor: The blood pressure monitor is a machine that's connected to a small cuff which is wrapped around the arm or leg of the patient. This cuff automatically takes the blood pressure and displays the data for review by care providers.

Oxygen hood: This is a clear box that fits over the baby's head and supplies oxygen. This is used for babies who can still breathe but need some respiratory support.

Ventilator: This is a breathing machine that delivers air to the lungs. Babies who are severely ill will receive this intervention. Typically, the ventilator takes the role of the lungs while treatment is administered to improve lung and circulatory function.

Possible functions of a neonatal incubator are:
 Oxygenation, through oxygen supplementation by head hood or nasal cannula, or even continuous positive airway pressure (CPAP) or mechanical ventilation. Infant respiratory distress syndrome is the leading cause of death in preterm infants, and the main treatments are CPAP, in addition to administering pulmonary surfactant and stabilizing the blood sugar, blood salts, and blood pressure.
 Observation: Modern neonatal intensive care involves sophisticated measurement of temperature, respiration, cardiac function, oxygenation, and brain activity.
 Protection from cold temperature, infection, noise, drafts and excess handling: Incubators may be described as bassinets enclosed in plastic, with climate control equipment designed to keep them warm and limit their exposure to germs.
 Maintaining fluid balance by providing fluid and keeping a high air humidity to prevent too great a loss from skin and respiratory evaporation.

A transport incubator is an incubator in a transportable form, and is used when a sick or premature baby is moved, e.g., from one hospital to another, as from a community hospital to a larger medical facility with a proper neonatal intensive-care unit. It usually has a miniature ventilator, cardio-respiratory monitor, IV pump, pulse oximeter, and oxygen supply built into its frame.

Pain management 
Many parents with newborns in the NICU have expressed that they would like to learn more about what types of pain their infants are feeling and how they can help relieve that pain. Parents want to know more about things such as; what caused their child's pain, if the pain that we feel is different than what they feel, how to possibly prevent and notice the pain, and how they could help their child through the pain they were struggling with. Another main worry that was mentioned was the long-term effects of their pain. Would it mentally affect the child in the future, or even affect the relationship they have with their parents?

Relieving pain 
There are multiple ways to manage pain for infants. If the mother is able to help, holding the infant in kangaroo position or breastfeeding can help calm the baby before a procedure is done. Other simple things that can help ease pain include; allowing the infant to suck on a gloved finger, gently binding the limbs in a flexed position, and creating a quiet and comfortable environment.

Patient populations 

Common diagnoses and pathologies in the NICU include:
 Anemia
 Apnea
 Bradycardia
 Bronchopulmonary dysplasia (BPD)
 Hydrocephalus
 Intraventricular hemorrhage (IVH)
 Jaundice
 Necrotizing enterocolitis (NEC)
 Patent ductus arteriosus (PDA)
 Periventricular leukomalacia (PVL)
 Infant respiratory distress syndrome (RDS)
 Retinopathy of prematurity (ROP)
 Neonatal sepsis
 Transient tachypnea of the newborn (TTN)

Levels of care 
The concept of designations for hospital facilities that care for newborn infants according to the level of complexity of care provided was first proposed in the United States in 1976. Levels in the United States are designated by the guidelines published by the American Academy of Pediatrics In Britain, the guidelines are issued by The British Association of Perinatal Medicine (BAPM), and in Canada, they are maintained by The Canadian Paediatric Society.

Neonatal care is split into categories or "levels of care". these levels apply to the type of care needed and is determined by the governing body of the area.

India
India has 3-tier system based on weight and gestational age of neonate.

Level I care
Neonates weighing more than 1800 grams or having gestational maturity of 34 weeks or more are categorized under level I care. The care consists of basic care at birth, provision of warmth, maintaining asepsis and promotion of breastfeeding. This type of care can be given at home, subcenter and primary health centre.

Level II care
Neonates weighing 1200-1800 grams or having gestational maturity of 30–34 weeks are categorized under level II care and are looked after by trained nurses and pediatricians. The equipment and facilities used for this level of care include equipment for resuscitation, maintenance of thermoneutral environment, intravenous infusion, gavage feeding, phototherapy and exchange blood transfusion. This type of care can be given at first referral units, district hospitals, teaching institutions and nursing homes.

Level III care
Neonates weighing less than 1200 grams or having gestational maturity of less than 30 weeks are categorized under level III care. The care is provided at apex institutions and regional perinatal centers equipped with centralized oxygen and suction facilities, servo-controlled incubators, vital signs monitors, transcutaneous monitors, ventilators, infusion pumps etc. This type of care is provided by skilled nurses and neonatologists.

United Kingdom 
The terminology used in the United Kingdom can be confusing because different criteria are used to designate 'special' and 'intensive' neonatal care locally and nationally.

Level 1 Neonatal Units
Also known as 'Special Care Baby Units' (SCBU).  These look after babies who need more care than healthy newborns but are relatively stable and mature.  SCBU might provide tube-feeding, oxygen therapy, antibiotics to treat infection and phototherapy for jaundice.  In a SCBU, a nurse can be assigned up to four babies to care for.

Level 2 Neonatal Units
Also known as 'Local Neonatal Units', these can look after babies who need more advanced support such as parenteral nutrition and continuous positive airway pressure (CPAP).  Confusingly, they may also look after babies who need short-term intensive care such as mechanical ventilation.  Babies who will need longer-term or more elaborate intensive care, for example extremely preterm infants, are usually transferred to a Level 3 unit.
Babies in a Level 2 unit may be classified for nursing purposes as 'Special Care', 'High Dependency' (HDU) (in which a nurse will be assigned up to two babies) or 'Intensive care' (where nursing is one-to-one, or sometimes even two-to-one).

Level 3 Neonatal Units
Also known as 'Neonatal Intensive Care Units' (NICU) - although Level 2 units may also have their own NICU.  These look after the smallest, most premature and most unwell babies and often serve a large geographical region.  Therapies such as prolonged mechanical ventilation, therapeutic hypothermia, neonatal surgery and inhaled nitric oxide are usually provided in Level 3 Units, although not every unit has access to all therapies.
Some babies being cared for in Level 3 units will require less intensive treatment and will be looked after in HDU or SCBU nurseries on the same site.  NHS England recommended in December 2019 that these units should  care for at least 100 babies weighing less than 1.5 kg, and usually perform more than 2,000 intensive care days per year.

United States 
The definition of a neonatal intensive-care unit (NICU) according to the National Center for Statistics is a "hospital facility or unit staffed and equipped to provide continuous mechanical ventilatory support for a newborn infant". In 2012, the American Academy of Pediatric updated their policy statement delineating the different levels of neonatal care. One major difference in the 2012 updated policy statement from the AAP compared to the 2004 policy statement is the removal of subspeciality nurseries for levels II and III with the addition of a level IV NICU. The four distinct levels of neonatal care defined in the most recent policy statement from the AAP are:
 Level I, Well newborn nursery
 Level II, Special care nursery
 Level III, Neonatal intensive-care unit (NICU)
 Level IV, Regional neonatal intensive-care unit (Regional NICU)

Level I (well newborn nursery) 
Level I units are typically referred to as the well baby nursery. Well newborn nurseries have the capability to provide neonatal resuscitation at every delivery; evaluate and provide postnatal care to healthy newborn infants; stabilize and provide care for infants born at 35 to 37 weeks' gestation who remain physiologically stable; and stabilize newborn infants who are ill and those born less than 35 weeks' gestation until transfer to a facility that can provide the appropriate level of neonatal care. Required provider types for well newborn nurseries include pediatricians, family physicians, nurse practitioners, and other advanced practice registered nurses.

Level II (special care nursery)
Previously, Level II units were subdivided into 2 categories (level IIA & level IIB) on the basis of their ability to provide assisted ventilation including continuous positive airway pressure. Level II units are also known as special care nurseries and have all of the capabilities of a level I nursery. In addition to providing level I neonatal care, Level II units are able to:
 Provide care for infants born ≥32-week gestation and weighing ≥1500 g who have physiologic immaturity or who are moderately ill with problems that are expected to resolve rapidly and are not anticipated to need subspecialty services on an urgent basis
 Provide care for infants who are feeding and growing stronger or convalescing after intensive care
 Provide mechanical ventilation for a brief duration (<24 h) or continuous positive airway pressure
 Stabilize infants born before 32-week gestation and weighing less than 1500 g until transfer to a neonatal intensive-care facility
 Level II nurseries are required to be managed and staffed by a pediatrician, however many Level II special care nurseries are staffed by neonatologists and neonatal nurse practitioners.

Level III (neonatal intensive-care unit) 
The 2004 AAP guidelines subdivided Level III units into 3 categories (level IIIA, IIIB & IIIC). Level III units are required to have pediatric surgeons in addition to care providers required for level II (pediatric hospitalists, neonatologists, and neonatal nurse practitioners) and level I (pediatricians, family physicians, nurse practitioners, and other advanced practice registered nurses). Also, required provider types that must either be on site or at a closely related institution by prearranged consultative agreement include pediatric medical subspecialists, pediatric anesthesiologists, and pediatric ophthalmologists. In addition to providing the care and having the capabilities of level I and level II nurseries, level III neonatal intensive-care units are able to:
 Provide sustained life support
 Provide comprehensive care for infants born <32 wks gestation and weighing <1500 g
 Provide comprehensive care for infants born at all gestational ages and birth weights with critical illness
 Provide prompt and readily available access to a full range of pediatric medical subspecialists, pediatric surgical specialists, pediatric anesthesiologists, and pediatric ophthalmologists
 Provide a full range of respiratory support that may include conventional and/or high-frequency ventilation and inhaled nitric oxide
 Perform advanced imaging, with interpretation on an urgent basis, including computed tomography, MRI, and echocardiography

Level IV (regional NICU) 
The highest level of neonatal care provided occurs at regional NICUs, or Level IV neonatal intensive-care units. Level IV units are required to have pediatric surgical subspecialists in addition to the care providers required for Level III units. Regional NICUs have all of the capabilities of Level I, II, and III units. In addition to providing the highest level of care, level IV NICUs:
 Are located within an institution with the capability to provide surgical repair of complex congenital or acquired conditions
 Maintain a full range of pediatric medical subspecialists, pediatric surgical subspecialists, and pediatric anesthesiologists at the site
 Facilitate transport and provide outreach education.

See also 
 Neonatology
 Pediatric intensive-care unit
 Embrace (organization)
 Neonatal nurse practitioner
 Neonatal nursing
 Bubble CPAP

References

External links 

 Life in the NICU: what parents can expect
 NeonatalICU.com - Expecting a Preterm Infant in the NICU
 Equipment used in the NICU -- interactive parent friendly information
 Association of Women's Health, Obstetric and Neonatal Nurses
 The Academy of Neonatal Nursing
 Pre Conception& Neonatal

Neonatology
Intensive care medicine
Hospital departments
Nursing
Infancy